Muhammed Akinci (born 20 April 1983) is a Danish retired footballer.

Career

Debuting for Silkeborg IF against Aarhus Gymnastikforening, in 2004/05 Akinci started 26 league games for the club and was considered one of the top prospects in the Danish top flight at the time.  In 2007, he signed for Konyaspor in Turkey, saying that "there is a huge difference from the time in Silkeborg. It is not at all the same as in Denmark. I can easily feel that I have come to a bigger club with the spectators and the expectations that are for us." However, Akinci sustained an in Turkey which kept him out of the game before joining Danish third division outfit Jammerbugt.

References

External links
 

Living people
Association football midfielders
Danish men's footballers
1983 births
Silkeborg IF players
Konyaspor footballers
Jammerbugt FC players
Turkish footballers
Danish Superliga players
Süper Lig players
1922 Konyaspor footballers